Roupala loxensis is a species of plant in the family Proteaceae. It is endemic to Ecuador.

References

Flora of Ecuador
loxensis
Vulnerable plants
Taxonomy articles created by Polbot